Yorta Yorta v Victoria was a native title claim by the Yorta Yorta, an Aboriginal Australian people of north central Victoria. The claim was dismissed by Justice Olney of the Federal Court of Australia in 1998. Appeals to the Full Bench of the Federal Court of Australia in 2001 and the High Court of Australia in 2002 were also dismissed.

The determination by Justice Olney in 1998 ruled that the "tide of history" had "washed away" any real acknowledgement of traditional laws and any real observance of traditional customs by the applicants.

An appeal was made to the full bench of the Federal Court on the grounds that "the trial judge erroneously adopted a 'frozen in time' approach" and "failed to give sufficient recognition to the capacity of traditional laws and customs to adapt to changed circumstances". The Appeal was dismissed in a majority 2 to 1 decision.

The case was taken on appeal to the High Court of Australia but also dismissed in a 5 to 2 majority ruling in December 2002.

In consequence of the failed native title claim, in May 2004 the Victorian Government led by Premier Steve Bracks signed an historic co-operative management agreement with the Yorta Yorta people covering public land, rivers and lakes in north-central Victoria. The agreement gives the Yorta Yorta people a say in the management of traditional country including the Barmah State Park, Barmah Forest, Kow Swamp and public land along the Murray and Goulburn Rivers. Ultimate decision-making responsibility was retained by the Environment Minister.

See also
 List of Australian Native Title court cases

References

Native title case law in Australia
High Court of Australia cases
1998 in case law
1998 in the environment
2001 in case law
2002 in case law
History of Victoria (Australia)
1998 in Australian law
2002 in Australian law
Yorta Yorta